Sherzer Observatory is an astronomical observatory located on the campus of Eastern Michigan University. The observatory was established in 1903 with the construction of the new Natural Science Building, in Ypsilanti, Michigan. Following a devastating fire in 1989 a new observatory opened in September 1991 with a  apochromatic refractor telescope and German equatorial mount centered under a 6-meter dome.

History

The original observatory was located on old Pierce Hall and was damaged by a tornado and destroyed in 1893. It was then relocated to the roof of the new Natural Science Building in 1903. The building and observatory was later named after William Sherzer, a science professor at the school who conceived the design for the new building after seeing similar facilities on a visit to Germany.

In 1928, a  refractor telescope manufactured by telescope maker and amateur astronomer John Mellish was installed on a German equatorial mount built by physics professor Edwin Strong. The University Archives still has data produced by students using this telescope and the brass Negus transit telescope which shared the observatory with the Mellish refractor.

In the 1970s and 1980s, members of the EMU student astronomy club made numerous updates and restorations to keep the aging observatory running. Almost half of Sherzer Hall was destroyed in a fire in 1989, including the original observatory.  The university decided to rebuild.

The new observatory opened in September 1991 with a  apochromatic refractor telescope and German equatorial mount centered under a 6-meter dome.  A classroom/computer lab was finished in 1997, and additional  to  telescopes, CCD cameras, and other equipment added to the inventory for student use.  A secondary observatory with an automated  SCT for CCD imaging was added to the rooftop level, becoming operational in 2008.

Sherzer Hall

Sherzer Hall is an academic building on the Eastern Michigan University campus, located in Ypsilanti, Michigan. Sherzer Hall is one of four buildings comprising the Eastern Michigan University Historic District on the National Register of Historic Places. The building was designed by E. W.. Arnold of Battle Creek and survived two fires. Sherzer Hall has a red-brick exteriors  Sherzer's exterior has a few mildly Romanesque and Georgian elements. Due to its unique style causes it to defies stylistic classification. Sherzer also is home to Sherzer Observatory which was established in 1878 and eventually moved to the top of Sherzer Hall in 1903.

See also
 List of astronomical observatories

Notes

References
 

Astronomical observatories in Michigan
Buildings at Eastern Michigan University
Buildings and structures completed in 1903
Tourist attractions in Washtenaw County, Michigan
1878 establishments in Michigan